Euprymna albatrossae is a species of bobtail squid native to the western Pacific Ocean off the Philippines and Japan. The depth range of E. albatrossae is unknown. The type specimens were collected using a nightlight.

The type specimen was collected off the Philippines and is deposited at the National Museum of Natural History in Washington, D.C.

References

External links

Bobtail squid
Molluscs described in 1962